Aphyllodium is a genus of flowering plants in the legume family, Fabaceae. It belongs to the subfamily Faboideae. Members of the genus are found in various parts of Australia, South Asia, Southeastern Asia, and south China.

References 

 
Fabaceae genera